Edward Leon Beach Jr. (January 25, 1929 – March 15, 1996) was an American basketball player.

Beach played collegiately for the West Virginia University. He was selected by the Minneapolis Lakers in the 5th round of the 1950 NBA draft. He played for the Lakers and Tri-Cities Blackhawks (1950–51) in the NBA for 12 games. His career in the NBA ended when he was drafted in the United States Army for the Korean War.

References

External links

WVU Stats

1929 births
1996 deaths
All-American college men's basketball players
American men's basketball players
Basketball players from New Jersey
Forwards (basketball)
Minneapolis Lakers draft picks
Minneapolis Lakers players
Sportspeople from Elizabeth, New Jersey
Thomas Jefferson High School (New Jersey) alumni
Tri-Cities Blackhawks players
West Virginia Mountaineers men's basketball players
United States Army personnel of the Korean War